The 1988–89 DDR-Oberliga season was the 41st and final season of the DDR-Oberliga, the top level of ice hockey in East Germany. Two teams participated in the league, and SG Dynamo Weißwasser won the championship.

Participating teams

Game results

1st series

2nd series 

Dynamo Weißwasser overall won series 2–0

References

External links
East German results 1970-1990

1988-89
Ger
Oberliga
1988 in East German sport
1989 in East German sport